National Cycle Route 12 is part of the National Cycle Network managed by the charity Sustrans. It currently has a length of  but is incomplete. When fully constructed it will run from Enfield Lock (London) to Grimsby (Lincolnshire) in the United Kingdom.

Route

Enfield to Hatfield

Enfield | Potter's Bar | Hatfield |

The route starts at Enfield Lock at the junction with National Cycle Route 1.  The route is open and signed through Enfield to Chase Farm where it ends at the A1005.  The extension on to Hadley Wood is due for construction by the end of 2017, according to Enfield Council.  For now, there is an unsigned route via Oak Ave, Hadley Road and Ferny Hill, but this road is steep and can be busy.

At Hadley Wood station, route 12 starts again as The Great North Way and is continuous from Hadley Wood station on the railway line from London to north of Letchworth at the Hertfordshire county boundary.  There is a short cut cycle route direct from the station to Waggon Road.

At South Mimms the route has an entrance to South Mimms Services, the service station on the M25 Motorway. The section from Hadley Wood to South Mimms is mostly on road.  North of South Mimms the route is mostly on segregated path to Hatfield.

Hatfield to Arlesey

Hatfield | Welwyn Garden City | Stevenage | Letchworth | Arlesey  

In Hatfield there is a spiral bridge and a scenic off-road section through Streamwoods. However this has two gates which block use by tricycles and tandems.  It can be avoided by following the cycle path along Travellers Lane.  The route passes through Old Hatfield and near to Mill Green Museum (watermill), the off-road section then continuing into Welwyn Garden City.  This section is shared in part with National Cycle Route 61. The cycle route then winds through the quiet streets of the Handside part of Welwyn Garden City to reach an off-road path (unsurfaced) through Sherrardspark Wood.

North west of Welwyn Garden City NCR12 follows quiet country lanes but with some very steep hills near Codicote.  It passes Knebworth House and then descends to join the off-road cycle path network through Stevenage and Old Stevenage.  Another rural section, mostly off-road and partly unsurfaced leads to Letchworth where there is a choice of either a route to the east between Baldock and Letchworth or via the centre of Letchworth Garden City.  This latter route takes in the UK's first gyratory roundabout. North of the county boundary the route can be followed to Arlesey station.

Arlesey to Huntingdon

Arlesey | Biggleswade | St Neots  |Huntingdon 

This section of the route is incomplete until the southern edge of Biggleswade, so you have to follow local roads.   At Biggleswade you can either follow route 12 through the town or use the Biggleswade Green Wheel to pass around the town to the east.  Route 12 continues, signed, to Sandy and then via St Neots and then via Grafham Water to Huntingdon.

Huntingdon to Grimsby

Huntingdon | Peterborough | Spalding | Boston | Grimsby

North of Huntingdon route 12 takes a slightly roundabout rural route to Peterborough to avoid the A1(M) before continuing north east to Spalding via Crowland, with its remarkable three way medieval Trinity bridge. 

It may be worth noting that the part of Route 12 running through Peterborough's Bridge Street has a cycling ban in place approximately Monday-Saturday 9:00 am – 6:00pm and Sunday 9:00 am – 4:00pm.

In due course the route will extend north from Spalding to meet National Cycle Network route 1 at Fossdyke.

References

External links
National Cycle Route 12 at sustrans.com

Transport in the London Borough of Enfield
Transport in Hertfordshire
Transport in Cambridgeshire
Transport in Lincolnshire
National Cycle Routes